With These Hands is a 1985 studio album from the British band The Farmer's Boys.

Track listing
 "In the Country"
 "I Built the World"
 "Sport for All"
 "Art Gallery"
 "Something from Nothing"
 "Phew Wow"
 "All of a Sudden"
 "Heartache"
 "Walkabout"
 "Whatever Is He Like"

1985 albums
EMI Records albums
The Farmer's Boys albums